The Chicago mayoral election of 1883 was held on Tuesday April 3, saw incumbent Carter Harrison Sr. defeat Republican Eugene Cary by a double-digit margin.

By winning the 1883 election, Harrison became the second mayor in Chicago history to be elected to a third term (after only Francis Cornwall Sherman), and the first to be elected to a third consecutive term.

By the day of the election, Harrison was already the second-longest serving mayor in the city's history, and was only roughly a month shy of surpassing Monroe Heath as the longest serving mayor.

Harrison's 15% margin of victory was the greatest in all of his campaigns for mayor.

Harrison's opponent, Eugene Cary, was a member of the Chicago Common Council that had previously been county judge and city attorney in Sheboygan, Wisconsin and had also served as a member of the Tennessee Senate.

Campaign
A key issue of the election was the "high licenses" for liquor sales in the city. Cary favored the high license.

During the campaign, many reformers, newspapers, and business interests coalesced their support behind a Citizen's Ticket that supported Republican nominee Eugene Cary for mayor.

Results

64% of the city's German population voted for Harrison.

References

Mayoral elections in Chicago
Chicago
Chicago
1880s in Chicago